Leopoldo Querol (November 15, 1899August 26, 1985) was a Spanish classical pianist.

Querol was born in Vinaròs, Castellón in 1899.  He was a graduate of the Valencia Conservatory.

In 1936 he was the soloist at the premiere of Federico Elizalde's Sinfonia Concertante for piano and orchestra, conducted by the composer.  He also premiered Elizalde's Piano Concerto in 1947 in Paris.

The Concierto heroico for piano and orchestra (1935–43) by Joaquín Rodrigo was composed for him.

He died in Benicàssim, Castellón in 1985, aged 85.

1899 births
1985 deaths
People from Vinaròs
Musicians from the Valencian Community
Spanish classical pianists
Male classical pianists
20th-century classical pianists
20th-century Spanish musicians
20th-century Spanish male musicians